An incomplete list of events in 1284 in Italy:

Events
 Battle of the Gulf of Naples
 Battle of Meloria (1284)

Births
 Simone Martini

Deaths
 Nicola Pisano

Italy
Italy
13th century in Italy